The BL 7.5-inch gun Mark VI was the 45 calibre naval gun forming the main battery of Royal Navy s.  These ships with seven single gun mounts were significant to the cruiser limitations defined by the Washington Naval Treaty.

Description 
These were built-up guns with two tubes, full-length wire winding, a jacket, and Welin breech block with hand-operated Asbury mechanism.  The mounting was a CP Mk V a hand-operated central pivot mount with additional power training and elevation provided by a 10HP electric motor and hydraulic pump.  Elevation was +30 degrees to -5 degrees and loading was possible up to +10 degrees.  The total weight of the mount including its 1in open-backed shield was 45.975 tons.  They used two cloth bags each containing 14 kg (31 pounds) of cordite to fire a 200-pound (91-kg) projectile up to 19 kilometres at their maximum elevation of 30 degrees.  Useful life expectancy was 650 effective full charges (EFC) per barrel.

Coast defence guns 
Seven guns were installed as coastal artillery in the Netherlands Antilles, five in Mozambique, three in Canada, and three in a battery at South Shields during the Second World War.

Shell trajectory

See also 
 List of naval guns
 BL 7.5-inch Mk II – V naval gun (earlier Royal Navy guns of the same calibre)
 BL 8-inch Mk VIII naval gun (used on subsequent Royal Navy heavy cruisers)

Notes and references

Bibliography

External links 

 Tony DiGiulain, Britain 7.5"/45 (19 cm) Mark VI

Naval guns of the United Kingdom
190 mm artillery
World War II naval weapons of the United Kingdom
Coastal artillery